This is a list of films produced in the Netherlands during the 1960s. The films are produced in the Dutch language.

1960s
Films
Lists of 1960s films